James Michael Lattimer (born 12 April 1950 in Marion, Indiana) is a nuclear astrophysicist who works on the dense nuclear matter equation of state and neutron stars.

Career

Lattimer completed his BSc in 1972 at the University of Notre Dame and his PhD in 1976 at the University of Texas at Austin. After postdocs at the University of Chicago and University of Illinois at Urbana-Champaign, in 1979 he became a professor at Stony Brook University and in 2013 became a Distinguished Professor of Physics and Astronomy.  He is an American Physical Society Fellow (2001), and has received a Guggenheim (J.S.) Fellowship (1999), a Sloan (Alfred P.) Fellowship (1982), and the Fullam (Ernest F.) Award from Dudley Observatory (1985).  In 2015, Lattimer was awarded the Hans Bethe Prize for "outstanding theoretical work connecting observations of supernovae and neutron stars with neutrino emission and the equation of state of matter beyond nuclear density."

He is associate editor of the Physical Review Letters.

Research
Lattimer has made a number of fundamental contributions to the field of nuclear astrophysics, with a particular focus on neutron stars.  One
of his biggest impacts  was modeling the birth of neutron stars from
supernovae in 1986 with then-research assistant professor Adam Burrows.  This came just six months
before the closest supernova in modern history (SN 1987A, in the
LMC).  Their paper  predicted the signature of neutrinos from
supernovae that was subsequently validated by neutrino observations,
from SN 1987A on Feb. 23, 1987.

In work that led to his PhD thesis, Lattimer and his advisor David N. Schramm first
argued that the mergers of neutron stars and black holes would result in the ejection of neutron-rich matter in sufficient quantities to explain the origin of r-process elements such as gold and platinum.  Later, with collaborators, he demonstrated decompressing neutron-star matter from both neutron star-black hole and neutron star-neutron star mergers would form a natural r-process that would match observed patterns.  Mass ejection and r-process nucleosynthesis from  decompression has been apparently observed in the aftermath of GW170817, the first merger of two neutron stars detected by LIGO/VIRGO.  The inferred r-process mass seems sufficient that neutron star mergers are likely the dominant source of these nuclides.

Lattimer and collaborators also proposed that
the recently observed rapid cooling of the neutron star in the
Cassiopeia A supernova remnant is the first direct evidence for superfluidity and superconductivity in neutron star interiors. He has collaborated extensively with Madappa Prakash.

References

External links
Homepage of James Lattimer at Stony Brook University

Living people
1950 births
20th-century American physicists
21st-century American physicists
American nuclear physicists
American astrophysicists
University of Notre Dame alumni
University of Texas at Austin alumni
Stony Brook University faculty
Fellows of the American Physical Society
Sloan Research Fellows
People from Marion, Indiana